Michael James Black (born 6 October 1976) is an English former professional footballer who played as a midfielder and forward. After beginning his career in the Arsenal academy, he played in the Football League for Tranmere Rovers and Southend United, before dropping into non-League football in 2002.

Career

Arsenal 
Black began his career as a trainee Arsenal academy in 1993 and was later joined in the academy by his brother Tommy. He won the 1994 FA Youth Cup with the youth team and received a first team squad number for the 1997–98 season. Black joined Second Division club Brentford on a one-month loan on 29 August 1997. He failed to make an appearance for the club and joined Second Division club Millwall on a three-month loan on 3 October 1997. He made his debut the following day, playing the full 90 minutes of a 2–1 victory over Blackpool and scored the first senior goal of his career in the following game, with the winner in a 2–1 victory over Oldham Athletic. Black made 14 appearances and scored two goals before returning to Arsenal on 3 January 1998.

Black made his only senior appearance for Arsenal in a UEFA Champions League group stage match against Panathinaikos on 9 December 1998, when he replaced Alberto Méndez after 78 minutes of the 3–1 win. Black was released by the Gunners at the end of the 1998–99 season.

Tranmere Rovers 
Black signed a permanent contract with First Division club Tranmere Rovers in July 1999. He made 27 appearances during the 1999–00 season and was an unused substitute during the 2–1 2000 League Cup Final defeat to Leicester City. Black failed to make an appearance for Tranmere during the 2000–01 season and departed the club on 31 January 2001.

Southend United 
Black joined Third Division club Southend United on a one-month loan on 29 December 2000 and after three appearances, his loan was made permanent on 31 January 2001. He made 16 appearances and scored one goal during the 2000–01 season. After failing to agree terms over a new contract, Black left the club during the 2001 off-season.

Barking & East Ham United 
Following persistent trouble with a knee ligament problem (which caused potential moves to Chesterfield and Queens Park Rangers to fall through), Black joined Isthmian League First Division club Barking & East Ham United during the early months of the 2001–02 season. After returning to fitness, Black was awarded the captaincy and won the club's Supporters' Player of the Year award. He signed new contract in April 2002 and left the club at the end of the 2002–03 season.

Bishop's Stortford 
Black signed for Isthmian League Premier Division club Bishop's Stortford during the 2003 off-season. Utilised as a substitute or rarely completing 90 minutes when given a start, Black made only seven appearances for the club before departing in late October 2003.

Return to Barking & East Ham United 
Black re-signed for Barking & East Ham United in late October 2003. He made three appearances before leaving the club on 8 November. During his two spells with the club, Black made 91 appearances and scored 15 goals.

Billericay Town 

Black joined Isthmian League Premier Division club Billericay Town in early November 2003. He made 23 appearances and scored two goals during the 2003–04 season and departed the Blues at the end of the campaign.

Cheshunt 
Black signed for Isthmian League Premier Division club Cheshunt in August 2004. He made 20 appearances during his time with the Ambers.

Boreham Wood 
Black signed for Southern League Eastern Division club Boreham Wood in January 2005. He was one of a mass exodus of Cheshunt staff to sign for the Wood, which included 10 players and manager Andy Leese. Remaining with the club for the 2005–06 season, Black made the highest seasonal appearance and goalscoring totals of his career so far, with 46 appearances and six goals. In a successful season, the Wood reached the FA Trophy semi-finals and won the Southern League First Division East championship. He left the club at the end of the 2005–06 season.

Enfield Town 
Black signed for Isthmian League First Division North club Enfield Town prior to the start of the 2006–07 season. His time with the club was fleeting and he made his eighth and final appearance in a 0–0 draw with Aveley on 23 September.

Potters Bar Town 
Black joined Isthmian League First Division North club Potters Bar Town in November 2006. In a mediocre season for the club, he made 33 appearances and scored one goal.

Return to Billericay Town 
Black moved back up to the Isthmian League Premier Division to re-sign for Billericay Town in November 2007. He made 19 appearances and scored no goals during what remained of the 2007–08 season and was released at the end of the campaign.

Tilbury 
Black signed for Isthmian League First Division North club Tilbury during the 2008 off-season. He won the second piece of silverware of his career when he played in the 2–0 2009 Isthmian League Cup Final win over Harrow Borough on 8 April. During the course of the 2008–09 season, Black made 44 appearances and five goals. He departed the club during the 2009 off-season, citing work commitments.

Hutton Old Boys 
Black joined Essex Saturday Veterans League Premier Division club Hutton Old Boys in 2012 and won the league title and the Essex Saturday Veterans Cup during the 2013–14 season. He made 12 appearances and scored five goals during the 2013–14 season. He won further Veterans Cups, as both player and manager, in the 2014–15, 2015–16 and 2017–18 seasons.

Career statistics

Honours 
Arsenal
 FA Youth Cup: 1993–94

Boreham Wood

 Southern League First Division East: 2005–06

Tilbury

 Isthmian League Cup: 2008–09
Hutton Old Boys
 Essex Veterans League Premier Division: 2012–13
 Essex Saturday Veterans Cup: 2013–14

Individual

 Barking & East Ham United Supporters' Player of the Year: 2001–02

References

External links

Michael Black at arsenal.com

Living people
People from Chigwell
1976 births
English footballers
Arsenal F.C. players
Millwall F.C. players
Brentford F.C. players
Tranmere Rovers F.C. players
Southend United F.C. players
Enfield Town F.C. players
Tilbury F.C. players
English Football League players
Barking & East Ham United F.C. players
Bishop's Stortford F.C. players
Billericay Town F.C. players
Cheshunt F.C. players
Boreham Wood F.C. players
Potters Bar Town F.C. players
Isthmian League players
Southern Football League players
Association football forwards
Association football midfielders